| genre           = 
| instrument      = 
| years_active    = 2016–present
| label           = 
| associated_acts = 
| website         = 
}}

Tay Schmedtmann (born 25 October 1996) is a German singer. He appeared on and won the sixth season of The Voice of Germany.

References 

1996 births
Living people
21st-century German male  singers
English-language singers from Germany
German pop singers
The Voice (franchise) winners
Winner06
Universal Music Group artists